Castanopsis lucida is a tree in the family Fagaceae. The specific epithet  is from the Latin meaning "shining", referring to the leaf surface.

Description
The brown bark is glabrescent, lenticellate, fissured or occasionally smooth.

Distribution and habitat
Castanopsis lucida grows naturally in Borneo, Peninsular Malaysia and Singapore. Its habitat is hill dipterocarp forests up to  altitude.

Uses
The bark produces tannin. The nuts are considered edible.

References

lucida
Trees of Borneo
Trees of Malaya
Plants described in 1831
Flora of the Borneo lowland rain forests